Eric Hunt (born June 11, 1957) is a former American football defensive back who played for the Dallas Cowboys in 1980. He played college football at San Jose State University.

References 

1957 births
Living people
American football defensive backs
San Jose State Spartans football players
Dallas Cowboys players
Compton High School alumni